De Oegekloostermolen is a hollow post mill in Hartwerd, Friesland, Netherlands which was built before 1830. The mill has been restored to working order. It is listed as a Rijksmonument, number 39347.

History

De Oegekloostermolen was first marked on a map dated 1830. It was built to drain the  Hartwerd-West polder.  A restoration was carried out in 1970 by millwright Westra of Franeker. In 1981, the mill was sold by the Knol brothers to De Hollandsche Molen. In 1986, Westra fitted a new roof and sails to the mill. A further restoration in 1985 put the mill back into full working order. The mill was working until 1989. On 17 May 1989 it was sold to Stichting De Fryske Mole. The mill is kept in reserve should it be needed to drain the polder.

Description

De Oegekloostermolen is what the Dutch describe as an spinnenkop. It is a hollow post mill on a single storey octagonal roundhouse, one of only four in Friesland. The mill is winded by tailpole and winch. The roundhouse and mill body are boarded, while the roof is covered in horizontal weatherboards. The sails are Common sails. The sails are carried on a wooden windshaft The windshaft also carries the brake wheel which has 33 cogs. This drives the wallower (16 cogs) at  the top of the upright shaft. At the bottom of the upright shaft, the crown wheel, which has 27 cogs drives a gearwheel with 28 cogs on the axle of the Archimedes' screw. The axle of the Archimedes' screw is  diameter. It is inclined at 25°. Each revolution of the screw lifts  of water.

Public access
De Oegekloostermolen is open by appointment.

References

Buildings and structures completed in the 19th century
Windmills in Friesland
Hollow post mills in the Netherlands
Windpumps in the Netherlands
Rijksmonuments in Friesland